FZR may refer to:
 Firozpur Cantonment railway station, in Punjab, India
 Forschungszentrum Rossendorf, now the Helmholtz-Zentrum Dresden-Rossendorf, a German research laboratory
 Zirconium fluoride (FZr)